Jordan DeMercy (born July 9, 1988) is an American professional basketball player who played for the Akita Northern Happinets of the Japanese bj league.

College statistics

|-
| style="text-align:left;"| 2007–08
| style="text-align:left;"| Florida State
|31 || 0 || 9.7 ||.500 ||.300  || .200  || 1.45 ||0.52 ||0.48  ||0.16  || 1.39
|-
| style="text-align:left;"| 2008–09
| style="text-align:left;"| Florida State
|35  || 16 || 19.7 ||.375 ||.256  ||.581||2.57  ||1.71 || 0.77 || 0.34 || 3.06
|-
| style="text-align:left;"| 2009–10 
| style="text-align:left;"|Florida State
| 21 || 0 || 14.2 || .419 || .214 || .821|| 2.14 ||  0.67|| 0.86 || 0.29 || 3.71
|-
| style="text-align:left;"| 2010–11
| style="text-align:left;"| Georgetown KY
| ||  ||  || ||  ||||  || ||  ||  || 
|-
|- class="sortbottom"
! style="text-align:center;" colspan=2|  Career

!87 ||16 || 14.8 ||.412 || .254 ||.623  || 2.07 ||1.03  || 0.69 ||0.26  || 2.62
|-

Career statistics 

|-
| align="left" |  2012–13
| align="left" | Akita
| 14 ||  || 16.1 || .617 || .556 || .500 || 4.7 || 1.6 || 1.3 || 0.6 || 8.9
|-
| align="left" |  2013–14
| align="left" | BAK
| 5 || 0 || 6.9 || .200 || .000 || .000 || 1.60 || 0.40 || 0.60 || 0.40 || 0.40
|-
| align="left" |  2015
| align="left" | Bucaros
| 15 ||  || 29.7 || .623 || .282 || .607 || 7.7 || 4.7 || 1.8 || 0.7 || 14.1
|-

External links
Jordan DeMercy-#21 White
Highlights

References

1988 births
Living people
Akita Northern Happinets players
American expatriate basketball people in Colombia
American expatriate basketball people in Japan
American men's basketball players
Bakersfield Jam players
Basketball players from Georgia (U.S. state)
Florida State Seminoles men's basketball players
Georgetown Tigers men's basketball players
Norcross High School alumni
Forwards (basketball)
Sportspeople from the Atlanta metropolitan area